Atlético Villacarlos are a Spanish football club that play in the Regional Preferente de Menorca. The club is based in Es Castell, the most easterly town in Spain.

Season to season

1 season in Tercera División

External links
ffib.es profile
Futbolme.com profile

Football clubs in the Balearic Islands
Association football clubs established in 1965
Sport in Menorca
Divisiones Regionales de Fútbol clubs
1965 establishments in Spain